Swimming at the 2011 Arab Games was held at Hamad Aquatic Center in Doha, Qatar from 17–22 December. A total of 38 long course (50m) events were contested. The top medal-winning athletes from the Games both came from Swimming: Tunisia's Oussama Mellouli (15 golds, 1 silver) and Egypt's Farida Osman (7 golds).

Participating nations
17 nations entered 115 swimmers (77 males, 38 females) at the 2011 Arab Games:

Results

Men

Women

Medal standings

References

Pan Arab Games
Events at the 2011 Pan Arab Games
2011